Róza Kasprzak (born 9 April 1982 in Trzcianka) is a Polish former pole vaulter.

International competitions

References

External links
EAA profile

1982 births
Living people
Polish female pole vaulters
People from Czarnków-Trzcianka County
Sportspeople from Greater Poland Voivodeship
Competitors at the 2005 Summer Universiade